The Gadabuursi (Somali: Gadabuursi, Arabic: جادابورسي), also known as Samaroon (Arabic: قبيلة سَمَرُون), is a northern Somali clan, a sub-division of the Dir clan family.

The Gadabuursi are geographically spread out across three countries: Ethiopia, Somaliland and Djibouti. Among all of the Gadabuursi inhabited regions of the Horn of Africa, Ethiopia is the country where the majority of the clan reside. In Ethiopia, the Gadabuursi are mainly found in the Somali Region, but they also inhabit the Harar, Dire Dawa and Oromia regions.

In Somaliland, the Gadabuursi are the predominant clan of the Awdal Region. They are mainly found in cities and towns such as Borama, Baki, Lughaya, Zeila, Dilla, Jarahorato, Amud, Abasa, Fiqi Aadan, Quljeed, Boon and Harirad. In Ethiopia, the Gadabuursi are the predominant clan of the Awbare district in the Fafan Zone, the Dembel district in the Sitti Zone and the Harrawa Valley. They are mainly found in cities and towns such as Awbare, Awbube, Sheder, Lefe Isa, Derwernache, Gogti, Jaare, Heregel, Arabi and Dembel.

The etymology of the name Gadabuursi, as described by writer Ferrand in Ethnographic Survey of Africa refers to Gada meaning people and Bur meaning mountain, hence the etymology of the name Gadabuursi means people of the mountains.

Overview
As a Dir sub-clan, the Gadabuursi have immediate lineal ties with the Issa, the Surre (Abdalle and Qubeys), the Biimaal (who the Gaadsen also belong to), the Bajimal, the Bursuk, the Madigan Dir, the Gurgura, the Garre (the Quranyow sub-clan to be precise as they claim descent from Dir), Gurre, Gariire, other Dir sub-clans and they have lineal ties with the Hawiye (Irir), Hawadle, Ajuran, Degoodi, Gaalje'el clan groups, who share the same ancestor Samaale.

I. M. Lewis gives an invaluable reference to an Arabic manuscript on the history of the Gadabuursi Somali. 'This Chronicle opens', Lewis tells us, 'with an account of the wars of Imam 'Ali Si'id (d. 1392) from whom the Gadabuursi today trace their descent, and who is described as the only Muslim leader fighting on the western flank in the armies of Se'ad ad-Din, ruler of Zeila:

I. M. Lewis (1959) states:
"Further light on the Dir advance and Galla withdrawal seems to be afforded by an Arabic manuscript describing the history of the Gadabursi clan. This chronicle opens with an account of the wars of Imam 'Ali Si'id (d. 1392), from whom the Gadabursi today trace their descent and who is described as the only Muslim leader fighting on the Western flank in the armies of Sa'd ad-Din (d. 1415), ruler of Zeila."

The Gadabuursi clan are divided into 2 main divisions, the Habar Makadur and Habar 'Affan. Most Gadabuursi members are descendants of Sheikh Samaroon. However, Samaroon does not necessarily mean Gadabuursi, but rather represents only a sub-clan of the Gadabuursi clan family.

The Gadabuursi in particular, is one of the clans with a longstanding institution of Sultan. The Gadabuursi use the title Ughaz or Ugaas which means sultan and/or king.

Based on research done by the Eritrean author 'Abdulkader Saleh Mohammad' in his book The Saho of Eritrea, the Saho people (Gadafur) is said to have Somali origins from the Gadabuursi.

For the treaty between the Gadabuursi and colonial powers, see "treaties".

Distribution

The Gadabuursi are mainly found in northwestern Somaliland and are the predominant clan of the Awdal Region.

Federico Battera (2005) states about the Awdal Region:
"Awdal is mainly inhabited by the Gadabuursi confederation of clans."

A UN Report published by Canada: Immigration and Refugee Board of Canada (1999), states concerning Awdal:
"The Gadabuursi clan dominates Awdal region. As a result, regional politics in Awdal is almost synonymous with Gadabuursi internal clan affairs."

Roland Marchal (1997) states that numerically, the Gadabuursi are the predominant inhabitants of the Awdal Region:
"The Gadabuursi's numerical predominance in Awdal virtually ensures that Gadabuursi interests drive the politics of the region."

Marleen Renders and Ulf Terlinden (2010) both state that the Gadabuursi almost exclusively inhabit the Awdal Region:
"Awdal in western Somaliland is situated between Djibouti, Ethiopia and the Issaq-populated mainland of Somaliland. It is primarily inhabited by the three sub-clans of the Gadabursi clan, whose traditional institutions survived the colonial period, Somali statehood and the war in good shape, remaining functionally intact and highly relevant to public security."

The Gadabuursi also partially inhabit the neighboring region of Maroodi Jeex, and reside in many cities within that province.  The Gadabuursi are the second largest clan by population in Somaliland after the Isaaq. Within Somalia, they are known to be the 5th largest clan.

The Gadabuursi are also found in Djibouti, where they are the second largest Somali clan. Within Djibouti they have historically lived in 2 of the 7 major neighborhoods in Djibouti (Quarter 4 and 5).

However the majority of the Gadabuursi inhabit Ethiopia.

Federico Battera (2005) states:
"But most of the Gadabuursi inhabit the Somali Region of Ethiopia (the so-called region five) where their paramount chief (the Ugaas) resides... In present day Awdal, most of the prominent elders have their main venues in the capital city of the region, Booroma. However, the paramount chief of the Gadabuursi local community, the Ugaas, has his main venue in Ethiopia."

In Ethiopia, the Gadabuursi exclusively inhabit both the Awbare district in the Fafan Zone and the Dembel district in the Sitti Zone. The Gadabuursi also exclusively inhabit the Harrawa Valley which is considered to be traditional Gadabuursi territory.

The Department of Sociology and Social Administration, Addis Ababa University, Vol. 1 (1994), describes the Awbare district as being predominantly Gadabuursi. The journal states:
"Different aid groups were also set up to help communities cope in the predominantly Gadabursi district of Aw Bare."

Filipo Ambrosio (1994) describes the Awbare district as being predominantly Gadabuursi whilst highlighting the neutral role that they played in mediating peace between the Geri and Jarso: 
"The Gadabursi, who dominate the adjacent Awbare district north of Jijiga and bordering with the Awdal Region of Somaliland, have opened the already existing camps of Derwanache and Teferi Ber to these two communities."

Filipo Ambrosio (1994) highlights how the Geri and Jarso both sought refuge on adjacent Gadabuursi clan territory after a series of conflicts broke out between the two communities in the early 1990s: 
"Jarso and Geri then sought refuge on 'neutral' adjacent Gadabursi territory in Heregel, Jarre and Lefeisa."

The Research-inspired Policy and Practice Learning in Ethiopia and the Nile region (2010) states that the Dembel district is predominantly Gadabuursi:
"Mainly Somali Gurgura, Gadabursi and Hawiye groups, who inhabit Erer, Dambal and Meiso districts respectively."

Richard Francis Burton (1856) describes the Harrawa Valley in the Gadabuursi country, as within sight of Harar:

"In front, backed by the dark hills of Harar, lay the Harawwah valley."

Captain H.G.C Swayne R.E. (1895) describes the Harrawa Valley as traditional Gadabuursi territory:
"On 5th September we descended into the Harrawa Valley in the Gadabursi country, and back on to the high ban again at Sarír, four days later. We then marched along the base of the Harar Highlands, reaching Sala Asseleh on 13th September. We had experienced heavy thunder-storms with deluges of rain daily, and had found the whole country deserted."

Captain H.G.C Swayne R.E. (1895) describes the Harrawa Valley as occupying an important strategic position in the Gadabuursi country:
"The position of the Samawé ruins would favour a supposition that some power holding Harar, and having its northern boundary along the hills which wall in the southern side of the Harrawa valley, had built the fort to command the Gáwa Pass, which is one of the great routes from the Gadabursi country up on to the Marar Prairie."

Richard Francis Burton describes the Gadabuursi and Geri Somali clans as extending to within sight of Harar. The Gadabuursi, along with the Geri, Issa and Karanle Hawiye represent the most native and indigenous Somali tribes in Harar.

Elisée Reclus (1886) describes one of the ancient routes from Harar to Zeila ascending the Darmi Pass which crosses the heartland of the Gadabuursi country:

"Two routes, often blocked by the inroads of plundering hordes, lead from Harrar to Zeila. One crosses a ridge to the north of the town, thence redescending into the basin of the Awash by the Galdessa Pass and valley, and from this point running towards the sea through Issa territory, which is crossed by a chain of trachytic rocks trending southwards. The other and more direct but more rugged route ascends north-eastwards towards the Darmi Pass, crossing the country of the Gadibursis or Gudabursis. The town of Zeila lies south of a small archipelago of islets and reefs on a point of the coast where it is hemmed in by the Gadibursi tribe. It has two ports, one frequented by boats but impracticable for ships, whilst the other, not far south of the town, although very narrow, is from 26 to 33 feet deep, and affords safe shelter to large craft."

The Gadabuursi inhabit the Gursum woreda where they are the majority and the Jijiga woreda where they make up a large part of the Fafan Zone. They partially inhabit Ayesha, Shinile, Erer and Afdem woreda's.A report for the BRIDGES Project

The Role of Education in Livelihoods in the Somali Region of Ethiopia Elanor Jackson. June 2011

http://fic.tufts.edu/assets/Education-Somali-Ethiopia.pdf

"In the Afdem in 1989–91 there was also a clan clash between the Issa and Gedabiersay(Gadabursi)" p. 92

The Gadabuursi also reside along the northeastern fringe of the chartered city-state of Dire Dawa, which borders the Dembel district, but also in the city itself. The Gadabuursi are the second largest sub-clan within the borders of the Somali Region of Ethiopia based on the Ethiopian population census. The 2014 Summary and Statistical report of the Population and Housing Census of the Federal Republic of Ethiopia has shown that Awbare is the most populated district in the Somali Region of Ethiopia.

The Gadabuursi of Ethiopia have also expressed a desire to combine the clan's traditional territories to form a new region-state called Harawo State.

 Saho people 
The Saho are an ethnic group inhabiting the Horn of Africa. They are principally concentrated in Eritrea, with some also living in adjacent parts of Ethiopia. They speak Saho, a Cushitic language which is related to Somali.

Among the Saho there is a saintly clan called the Gadafur. When it comes to the customary law of the Saho, the Gadafur, who are considered part of the holy families, act as religious leaders and political mediators of the Minifere tribes. The Gadafur have a high status and are highly privileged and respected among the Saho. It is said that the Gadafur are originally from the tribe of Gadabuursi.

 History 

 Medieval Age 
I. M. Lewis gives an invaluable reference to an Arabic manuscript on the history of the Gadabuursi Somali. 'This Chronicle opens', Lewis tells us, 'with an account of the wars of Imam 'Ali Si'id (d. 1392) from whom the Gadabuursi today trace their descent, and who is described as the only Muslim leader fighting on the western flank in the armies of Se'ad ad-Din, ruler of Zeila.

I. M. Lewis (1959) states:
"Further light on the Dir advance and Galla withdrawal seems to be afforded by an Arabic manuscript describing the history of the Gadabursi clan. This chronicle opens with an account of the wars of Imam 'Ali Si'id (d. 1392), from whom the Gadabursi today trace their descent and who is described as the only Muslim leader fighting on the Western flank in the armies of Sa'd ad-Din (d. 1415), ruler of Zeila."

I. M. Lewis (1959) also highlights that the Gadabuursi were in conflict with the Galla, during and after the campaigns against the Christian Abyssinians:
"These campaigns were clearly against the Christian Abyssinians, but it appears from the chronicle that the Gadabursi were also fighting the Galla. A later leader of the clan, Ugas 'Ali Makahil, who was born in 1575 at Dobo, north of the present town of Borama in the west of the British Protectorate, is recorded as having inflicted a heavy defeat on Galla forces at Nabadid, a village in the Protectorate."

Sa'ad ad-Din II was the joint founder of the Kingdom of Adal along with his brother Haqq ad-Din II. Not only did the Gadabuursi clan contribute to the Adal Wars and the Conquest of Abyssinia, but their predecessors were also fighting wars well before the establishment of the Adal Sultanate. The descendants praise and sing his hymns and make their pilgrimages to his local shrine at Tukali to commemorate their ancestor. The largest portion of the Gadabuursi reside in the borders of Ethiopia. According to traditional Gadabuursi history, a great battle took place between the Gadabuursi and the Galla in the 14th century at Waraf, a location near Hardo Galle in Ethiopia.

 Ethiopia 
All the trade routes linking Harar to the Somali coast passed through the Somali and Oromo territories where the Gadabuursi held a significant monopoly on the trade routes to the coast as is mentioned in the History of Harar and the Hararis:

"In the 19th century the jurisdiction of the Amirs was limited to Harar and its close environs, while the whole trade routes to the coast passed through Oromo and the Somali territories. There were only two practicable routes: one was the Jaldeissa, through Somali Issa and Nole Oromo territories, the other of Darmy through the Gadaboursi. The Somali, who held a monopoly as transporters, took full advantage of the prevailing conditions and the merchants were the victim of all forms of abuse and extortion... Under the supervision of these agents the caravan would be entrusted to abbans (caravan protector), who usually belonged to the Issa or Gadaboursi when destined to the coast and to Jarso when destined for the interior."

According to Max Planck, one branch of the Reer Ughaz family (Reer Ugaas) in Ethiopia rose to the rank of Dejazmach (Amharic: ደጃዝማች) or 'Commander of the Gate'. This was a military title meaning commander of the central body of a traditional Ethiopian armed force composed of a vanguard, main body, left and right wings and a rear body.[4]

 Djibouti 
The Gadabuursi were the pioneers of the name Côte Française des Somalis or the French Coast of the Somalis. Haji Dideh, the Sultan of Zeila and prosperous merchant coined the name to the French. He also built the first mosque in Djibouti. Before the French aligned with the Issa, the Gadabuursi held the position of the first Senator of the country and the first Somali head of state to lead the territory compromising Djibouti today. Djama Ali Moussa, a former sailor, pursued his political aspirations and managed to become the first Somali democratically elected head of state in French Somaliland.Subjects of Empires, Citizens of States: Yemenis in Djibouti and Ethiopia Prior to 1963, which coincided with the death of Djama Ali Moussa, political life in Djibouti was dominated by the Gadabuursi and Arab communities who were political allies and made up the majority of the inhabitants of the city of Djibouti. After his death, the Afar and Issa rose to power.

 The Ambassadorial Brothers 
The Ambassadorial Brothers were 3 brothers from a prominent family in the Horn of Africa.

They were:

 Ismail Sheikh Hassan 
 Aden Sheikh Hassan 
 Mohamed Sheikh Hassan

They were all children of Sheikh Hassan Nuriye and from the  Reer Ughaz (Reer Ugaas) subclan of the Makayl-Dheere section of the Gadabuursi.

Sheikh Hassan Nuriye in turn was a descendant of Mohamed Gele Ughaz Roble I. He was a famous sheikh in Somaliland, Ethiopia and Djibouti. He was based mainly in Ethiopia around Harar and Dire Dawa.

Eventually Sheikh Hassan Nuriye returned to his hometown of Teferi Ber (Awbare) and died there. He is buried in the town of Awbare next  to Sheikh Awbare. His sons came to be known as the Ambassadorial Brothers. They were the first prominent Somali or even African family to have 3 individuals who are directly related to each other as brothers serving as ambassadors for 3 different neighboring countries. 

 Balwo and Heello: Modern Somali Music 
Modern Somali music began with the balwo style, pioneered by Abdi Sinimo, who rose to fame in the early 1940s. Abdi's innovation and passion for music revolutionized Somali music forever. Its lyrical contents often deal with love, affection and passion. The Balwo genre was a forerunner to the Heello genre. Abdi Sinimo hailed from the North Western Regions of Somaliland and Djibouti, more precisely the Reer Nuur section of the Gadabuursi. Modern sung Somali Poetry was introduced in the Heello genre which is a form of Somali sung poetry. The Balwo name changed to Heello because of religious reasons. The earliest composers began their songs with Balwooy, Balwooy hoy Balwooy... however because of the negative connotation connected to the Balwo and the word implicating  calamity in Arabic the Balwo was changed to Heello and thus the first bars of songs began with Heelloy, Heellelloy.

See also:

 Balwo
 Abdi Sinimo

 Roble Afdeb (Rooble Afdeeb) 
Roble Afdeb was a famous Somali warrior and poet from the North Western part of Somaliland and Djibouti. Known to have pillaged and raided many Issa settlements. The poet and warrior is a legend in Somali history and was highly renowned for his bravery and gained fame not only through anti-colonialism or Islamic devotion, but clan rivalry.

For more about Rooble Afdeeb  visit the following:

 Ali Bu'ul (Cali Bucul) 
Ali Bu'ul was a famous Somali military leader and poet from the Western Somali regions, today within the borders of the Somali region of Ethiopia, known for his short lined poems (geeraar), compared to the long lines of gabay. Geeraar is traditionally recited on horseback during times of battle and war. Many of his most well known poems are still known today. He is also known to have battled the Somali religious leader named Mahamed Abdullah Hassan in poetry and coined the word Guulwade. Some of his famous works are Gammaan waa magac guud (Horse is a general term), Guulside (Victory-Bearer) and  Amaan Faras (In Praise of My Horse). His poems were also written in the Gadabuursi Script. An extract of a geeraar, Amaan Faras, featured in the image below illustrates the work written in the script.

For more about Ali Bu'ul  visit the following:

The image above translates as:

 Geography 
Many travelers have visited the Gadabuursi country. One of such travelers is Alfred Pease, who in the late 19th century described the Gadabuursi country as the most beautiful tract of country he had visited in Somaliland:

"And we continued our journey northwards along the northern edge of the Bur'Maado and Simodi ranges to Aliman. We found all this  country thickly inhabited by the Gadabursi, and  here alone, in  Northern Somaliland, we had the companionship for days together of a running stream. No part of Somaliland that I have visited is more beautiful than this tract of country, watered by an almost perennial stream, now lined with great trees festooned with the armo creeper, now with the high green elephant grass or luxuriant jungles, and guarded by woody and rocky mountains on the left hand and on the right. Between the Tug or Wady and these hills the, country had a park-like appearance, with its open glades and grassy plains. But the new and varied vegetation of Africa was not the only object delightful to the eye: countless varieties of birds, hawks, buzzards, Batteleur and larger eagles, vultures, dobie birds, golden orioles, parrots, paroquets, the exquisite Somali starlings, doves of all sorts and sizes, small and great honey-birds, hoopoes, jays, green pigeons, great flocks of Guinea fowl, partridges, sand grouse, were ever to be seen on every hand, and, while the bush teemed with Waller's gazelle and dik-diks, the plains with Scemmerring's antelope, with a sprinkling of oryx, our road up the Tug was constantly crossed by the tracks of lions, elephants, leopards, the ubiquitous hyaena, and other wild beasts."

Richard Francis Burton (1856) describes the flora and fauna of the Harrawa Valley in his book First Footsteps in East Africa:

"For six hours we rode the breadth of the Harawwah Valley: it was covered with wild vegetation, and surface-drains, that carry off the surplus of the hills enclosing it. In some places the torrent beds had cut twenty feet into the soil. The banks were fringed with milk-bush and Asclepias, the Armo-creeper, a variety of thorns, and especially the yellow-berried Jujube: here numberless birds followed bright-winged butterflies, and the "Shaykhs of the Blind," as the people call the black fly, settled in swarms upon our hands and faces as we rode by. The higher ground was overgrown with a kind of cactus, which here becomes a tree, forming shady avenues. Its quadrangular fleshy branches of emerald green, sometimes forty feet high, support upon their summits large round bunches of a bright crimson berry: when the plantation is close, domes of extreme beauty appear scattered over the surface of the country... At Zayla I had been informed that elephants are "thick as sand" in Harawwah: even the Gudabirsi, when at a distance, declared that they fed there like sheep, and, after our failure, swore that they killed thirty but last year."

Richard Francis Burton (1856) describes what he feels is the end of his journey when he witnesses the blue hills of Harar, which is the iconic backdrop of the Harrawa Valley in his book First Footsteps in East Africa:

"Beyond it stretched the Wady Harawwah, a long gloomy hollow in the general level. The background was a bold sweep of blue hill, the second gradient of the Harar line, and on its summit closing the western horizon lay a golden streak—the Marar Prairie. Already I felt at the end of my journey."

Richard Francis Burton (1856) describes the Abasa Valley in the Gadabuursi country as amongst the most beautiful spots he has seen:

"At half past three reloading we followed the course of the Abbaso Valley, the most beautiful spot we had yet seen. The presence of mankind, however, was denoted by the cut branches of thorn encumbering the bed: we remarked too, the tracks of lions pursued by hunters, and the frequent streaks of serpents, sometimes five inches in diameter."

 Gadabuursi Ughazate (Ugaasyada ama Boqortooyada Gadabuursi) 

The royal family of the Gadabuursi, the Ughazate, evolved from and is a successor kingdom to the Adal Sultanate and Sultanate of Harar. The first Ughaz (Ugaas) of this successor kingdom, Ali Makail Dera (Cali Makayl-Dheere) was the son of Makail Dera, the progenitor of the Makayl-Dheere. During the late 19th century, as the region became subject to colonial rule, the Ughaz assumed a more traditional and ceremonial leadership of the clan.

The Gadabuursi give their King the title of Ughaz. It's an authentic Somali term for King or Sultan. The Gadabuursi in particular are one of the clans with a longstanding tradition of having a Sultan.

History
The first Ughaz of the Gadabuursi was Ughaz Ali Makail Dera (Cali Makayl-Dheere), who is the progenitor of the Reer Ughaz (Reer Ugaas) subclan to which the royal lineage belongs.

Ughaz Ali Makail Dera (Cali Makayl-Dheere) who was born in 1575 in Dobo, an area north of the present town of Borama in north-western Somaliland, is recorded as having inflicted a heavy defeat on Galla forces at Nabadid.

I. M. Lewis (1959) highlights that the Gadabuursi were in conflict with the Galla during the reign of Ughaz Ali Makail Dera, during and after the campaigns against the Christian Abyssinians:
"These campaigns were clearly against the Christian Abyssinians, but it appears from the chronicle that the Gadabursi were also fighting the Galla. A later leader of the clan, Ugas 'Ali Makahil, who was born in 1575 at Dobo, north of the present town of Borama in the west of the British Protectorate, is recorded as having inflicted a heavy defeat on Galla forces at Nabadid, a village in the Protectorate."

Ughaz Nur I, who was crowned in 1698, married Faaya Aale Boore who was the daughter of a famous Oromo King and Chief, Aale Boore. Ughaz Nur I and Faaya Aale Boore gave birth to Ughaz Hiraab and Ughaz Shirdoon, who later became the 6th and 7th Ughaz respectively. Aale Boore was a famous Oromo King, the victory of the former over the latter marked a historical turning point in concluding the Oromo predominance in the Eastern Hararghe region.

The Gadabuursi managed to defeat and kill the next Oromo King after Aale Boore during the reign of Ughaz Roble I who was crowned in 1817. It is said that during his reign the Gadabuursi tribe reached great influence and tremendous height in the region, having managed to defeat the reigning Galla/Oromo King at that time whose name was Nuuno which struck a blow to the Galla's morale, due to their much loved King being killed. He was defeated by Geedi Bahdoon, also known as Geedi Malable. He struck a spear right through the King while he was in front of a tree, the spear pierced inside the tree making it not able for the King to escape or remove the spear. After he died he was  buried in an area that's now called Qabri Nuuno near Sheedheer. In the picture already shared titled 'An old map featuring the Harrawa Valley in the Gadabuursi country, north of Harar' one can read Gabri Nono, which is the anglicized version of the Somali Qabri Nuuno.

Ughaz Roble I died in 1848 and was buried in an area called Dhehror (Dhexroor), near Awbare. It has become the custom for Somalis after Ughaz Roble I that whenever an Ughaz gets inaugurated and it rains, he should be named Ughaz Roble, which translates to 'the one with rain' or 'rainmaker'.

Ughaz Nur II was born in Zeila in the year 1835 and crowned in Bagi in 1848. In his youth, he loved riding, hunting and the traditional arts and memorized a great number of proverbs, stories and poems.

Eventually, Ughaz Nur II created his own store of sayings, poems and stories that are quoted to this day. He knew by heart the Gadabuursi heer (customary law) and amended or added new heer during his reign. He was known for fair dealing to friend and stranger alike. It is said that he was the first Gadabuursi Ughaz to introduce guards and askaris armed with arrows and bows.

During the rule of Ughaz Nur II both Egypt and Ethiopia were contending for power and supremacy in the Horn of Africa. The European colonial powers were also competing for strategic territories and ports in the Horn of Africa.

In the year 1876, Egypt using Islam as a bargaining chip signed a treaty with Ughaz Nur II and came to occupy the Northern Somali coast which included Zeila. But the Egyptians also occupied the town of Harar and the Harar-Zeila-Berbera caravan route.

On 25 March 1885, the French government claimed that they signed a treaty with Ughaz Nur II of the Gadabuursi placing much of the coast and interior of the Gadabuursi country under the protectorate of France. The treaty titled in French, Traitè de Protectorat sur les Territoires du pays des Gada-Boursis, was signed by both J. Henry, the Consular Agent of France and Dependencies, at Harar-Zeila and Nur Robleh, Ughaz of the Gadabuursi. The treaty states as follows (translated from French):

"Between the undersigned J. Henry, Consular Agent of France and Dependencies, at Harrar-Zeilah and Nour Roblé, Ougasse of the Gada-boursis, independent sovereign of the whole country of the Gada-boursis, and to safeguard the interests of the latter who is asking for the protectorate of France,

It was agreed as follows:

Art. 1st – The territories belonging to Ougasse Nour-Roblé of the Gada-boursis from "Arawa" to "Hélo" from "Hélô" to Lebah-lé", from "Lebah-lé" to "Coulongarèta" extreme limit by Zeilah, are placed directly under the protection of France.

Art. 2 – The French government will have the option of opening one or more commercial ports on the coast belonging to the territory of the Gada-boursis.

Art. 3 The French government will have the option of establishing customs in the posts open to trade, and on the points of the borders of the territory of the Gada-boursis where it deems it necessary. Customs tariffs will be set by the French government, and the revenues will be applied to public services.

Art. 4 – Regulations for the administration of the country will be elaborated later by the French government. In agreement with the Ougasse of the Gada-boursis they will always be revisable at the will of the French government, a French resident may be established on the territory of the Gada-boursis to sanction by his presence the protectorate of France.

Art. 5 – The troops and the police of the country will be raised among the natives, and will be placed under the superior command of an officer designated by the French government. Arms and ammunition for the native troops may be provided by the French government and their balance taken from the public revenues, but, in case of insufficiency, the French government may provide for them.

Art. 6 – The Ougasse of the Gada-boursis, to recognize the good practices of France towards it, undertakes to protect the caravan routes and mainly to protect French trade, throughout the extent of its territory.

Art. 7 – The Ougasse of the Gada-boursis undertakes not to make any treaty with any other power, without the assistance and consent of the French government.

Art. 8 – A monthly allowance will be paid to the Ougasse of the Gada-boursis by the French government, this allowance will be fixed later, by a special convention, after the ratification of this treaty by the French government.

Art. 9 – This treaty was made voluntarily and signed by the Ougasse of the Gada-boursis, which undertakes to execute it faithfully and to adopt the French flag as its flag.

In witness whereof the undersigned have affixed their stamps and signatures.

J.Henry

Signature of Ougasse

Done at Zeilah on 9 Djemmad 1302 (March 25, 1885)."

The French claimed that the treaty with the Ughaz of the Gadabuursi gave them jurisdiction over the entirety of the Zeila coast and the Gadabuursi country. 

However, the British attempted to deny this agreement between the French and the Gadabuursi citing that that Ughaz had a representative at Zeila when the Gadabuursi signed their treaty with the British in December 1884 and that the treaty did not bear the signature of the Ughaz himself, thereby levelling allegations of forgery against the French government. The British suspected that this treaty was forged by the Consular Agent of France and Dependencies at Harrar-Zeila to circumvent British jurisdiction over the Gadabuursi country and allow France to lay claim to sections of the Somali coast. There was also suspicion that Ughaz Nur II had attempted to cause a diplomatic row between the British and French governments in order to consolidate his own power in the region.

According to I. M. Lewis, this treaty was never ratified, but it clearly influenced the demarcation of the boundaries between the two protectorates, establishing the coastal town of Djibouti as the future official capital of the French colony:

"By the end of 1885 Britain was preparing to resist an expected French landing at Zeila. Instead, however, of a decision by force, both sides now agreed to negotiate. The result was an Anglo-French agreement of 1888 which defined the boundaries of the two protectorates as between Zeila and Jibuti: four years later the latter port became the official capital of the French colony."

Fall of Harar in 1887
Ughaz Nur II went to Egypt and met Isma'il Pasha, the Khedive of Egypt, who honored him with medals and expensive gifts. The Ughaz there signed a treaty accepting Egyptian protection of Muslims in Somaliland and Ethiopia. According to I. M. Lewis, he was also gifted with firearms amongst other weapons.
In 1884, two years after Britain took over Egypt, Britain also occupied Egyptian territories, especially the northern Somali coast. However Ughaz Nur II had little to do with the British, as long as they did not interfere with his rule, the customs of his people, and their trade routes.
Ughaz Nur II had established strong relations with the Emir of Harar, Abdallah II ibn Ali. In 1887, when Harar was occupied by Menelik II of Ethiopia, Ughaz Nur II sent Gadabuursi askaris to support Abdallah II ibn Ali and in another historical account, he himself participated in the battle. Harar officially fell to Menelik in 1887.

Ughaz Nur II recited lines of poetry lamenting the fall of Harar to Menelik in 1887:

Ughaz Nur II was at first in a distinct and advantageous position, for not only did the caravan route to Harar run through Gadabuursi clan territory, but the Gadabuursi at the time were partly cultivating and so easier to control and tax. Yet for this very reason, after the 1897 Anglo-Egyptian Treaty, Ughaz Nur II, a far-sighted man, did everything in his power to prevent his people cultivating, for he realised that it would bring them under the control of the Amharic authority established at Harar. 
Colonel Stace (1893) mentioned that the Abyssinians were encroaching further into the Gadabuursi homeland near Harar:
 "The Abyssinians from Harar are encroaching more and more upon the Gadabursi country, as I anticipated would be the result of their unopposed occupation of Biyo Kaboba. I fear that they will make a permanent settlement in the Harrawa Valley from whence the encroachments and exactions will extend further into the Protectorate."
Ras Makonnen, the newly appointed Ethiopian governor of Harar, offered the Gadabuursi protection in exchange for collaboration. Ughaz Nur II refused and fought Ethiopian expansion until he died in 1898. Ughaz Nur II is buried in Dirri.

His work was and is still taught in Somali Poetry classes (Suugaan: Fasalka Koobaad) among other Somali poets. His poems were also written in the Gadabuursi Script.

For more about Ughaz Nur II, visit the following:

The image above translates as:
Translation of another variation of the poem by B. W. Andrzejewski (1993):

Major R. G. Edwards Leckie writes about his meeting with Ughaz Nur II in his A Visit to the Gadabuursi:

"We were warned that he did not love the Feringi (white man), and therefore thought it better to send a messenger ahead to His Majesty and return with a confidential report on the situation."

Major R. G. Edwards Leckie also writes about his appearance:

"This old man was Ugaz Nur, King or Sultan of the Gadabursi. He had several other names which I do not remember now... Ugaz Nur was about seventy five years old. Although stiffened by age, he was tall, straight and well built. Even the weight of his many years could not alter the chief's graceful figure... His dress was simple and lacked the usual Oriental splendour. Many of his subjects were attired much more gaily, but none looked more distinguished. He wore a crinkly white tobe, with the end of which he covered his head, forming a hood. Over this he wore a cloak of black cloth lined with crimson silk, probably a present from the Emperor of Abyssinia. In his hand he carried a simple staff instead of the regulation shield and spear. His fighting days were over, and he now relied upon his stalwart sons to protect him on his journeys. As he shook hands with us he smiled pleasantly. His manner was composed and dignified, evidently inherited from his ancestors, who were rulers in the country for many generations."

Ughaz Roble II was the 12th in line of the Gadabuursi Ughazate. Based mainly in Harar, he was crowned the Ughaz of the Gadabuursi after his father's (Ughaz Nur II) death. His position as Ughaz proved to be quite controversial amongst the Gadabuursi due to his close relationship with the Amharic establishment in Harar. He would go on to receive payments, gifts and weapons from the British, the French and the Abyssinians who were all vying for the region. He eventually fell out of favor with the British and became close allies with Menelik who officially inaugurated him as the Ughaz of the Gadabuursi in Ethiopia after the British ex-communicated and de facto exiled him from the British Protectorate.

When Lij Iyasu came to power in Abyssinia he cemented a close relationship with Ughaz Roble II and gave him a close female relative from the Ethiopian royal court in marriage.

The Arab Bureau, which was a collection of British intelligence officers headquartered in Cairo and charged with the task of coordinating imperial intelligence activities, recorded this event in the Arab Bureau Summaries Volumes 1–114 (1986), where it also mentioned that the British deposed Ughaz Roble II from power due to his alliance with the Ethiopian establishment:

"Lij Yasu has, however, given a female relative of his in marriage to the late Agaz of the Gadabursi, who was recently deposed by us for his intrigues and misgovernment."

Andrew Caplan (1971) records Lij Iyasu wanting to enter into an alliance with the Gadabuursi, in his book British policy towards Ethiopia 1909–1919:

"The Prince (Lij Iyasu) was also negotiating for an alliance with the Gadabursi Somali... He had given one of his relatives to its Ex-Ughaz Robleh Nur."

After the deposition of his ally Lij Iyasu by Empress Zewditu, Ughaz Roble II witnessed the October 1916 massacre of the inhabitants of Harar by Abyssinian soldiers and was given immunity along with some of the other prominent leaders in the region. This event marked a turning point in the relations between the Somalis and the ruling Abyssinians in the region. Ughaz Roble II was given special immunity because of his high profile and personal relations with those in the Ethiopian royal family to whom he was also related by virtue of marriage.
Ughaz Roble II was considered a very controversial figure and was the first Gadabuursi Ughaz to have been deposed by his own people. The deposition from position of Ughaz caused a huge stir amongst the Gadabuursi.
Ughaz Roble II was known to love hunting, archery, horse riding and he inherited a rifle that was given as a gift to his father Ughaz Nur II by the Khedive of Egypt, Isma'il Pasha. He died in 1938 and was buried in Awbare, which became the seat of the Ughazate of the Gadabuursi in the early 20th century.

Ughaz 'Elmi Warfa was the 13th in line of the Gadabuursi Ughazate. His other names were 'Ilmi-Dheere ('Elmi the Tall) and Kun 'Iil (A Thousand Sorrows).

In the late 1890s, the British appointed 'Elmi Warfa Ughaz of all the Gadabuursi in the British Protectorate. Ughaz 'Elmi thus supplanted the traditional line of
Ughaz Nur II and his successor, Ughaz Roble II, who had fallen out of favor with the British. Ughaz 'Elmi's authority was recognized in an installation ceremony in 1917 in Zeila. However the traditional successor of Ughaz Nur  II, Ughaz Robleh II, remained the Ughaz of the Gadabuursi in Ethiopia. Ughaz 'Elmi was a member of the delegation that had accompanied Ughaz Nur II to Egypt in the late 1870s and also was one of the Gadabuursi elders who signed the treaty with the British at Zeila in 1884.

Ughaz 'Elmi's usurpation of the traditional Gadabuursi line of succession provoked other sub-clans and caused a lot of controversy. Many sub-clans, especially the rer Yunus or the Yunus branch felt it was their turn to vie for the Ughaz-ship. This sparked a conflict which was also conducted in poetic duels. These poems were rich imagery and symbolism. Two of the best are "Dhega Taag" (A Battle-Cry) by 'Elmi  the Tall or '''Elmi Dheire' and the other  called "Aabudle" (A Declaration of Faith) by Farid Dabi-Hay, who was one of Ughaz 'Elmi's rivals.

For more about Ughaz 'Elmi Warfaa, visit the following:

Ughaz Dodi (Daudi) Ughaz Roble II, was crowned Ughaz of the Gadabuursi in Ethiopia in the late 1940s. Before he became Ughaz, he was appointed Dejazmach (Commander of the Gate) by the Ethiopian authorities. He was a source of constant problems for the British Protectorate and was accused of conspiring with Italian forces during World War II. After the war, British soldiers were sent to arrest him and he was eventually taken into custody whilst in Jijiga by the British and forcibly exiled to the Karaman Island in Yemen where he was imprisoned for 7 years. He was accompanied by his family in his forced exile. Ultimately he was released and when he returned to the British Protectorate he was immediately detained again on Saad-ud-Din Island, within the British governor's jurisdiction. The Gadabuursi recognized him as their Ughaz in a grand meeting of Gadabuursi notables in Ethiopia. After his return from forced exile, the Ethiopian government sent him a delegation informing him that Haile Selassie recognizes him as the Ughaz of the Gadabuursi in Ethiopia. Despite this, during the end of his life Ughaz Dodi refused to recognize Ethiopian rule and returned the Ethiopian delegation that was sent to him. In 1948, Ughaz Dodi along with Sultan Hassan of the Jidwaq, signed a document called 'Petition for Amalgamation from the Jigjiga area, with the other Somali territories.' This document was primarily signed in order to petition the Four Power Commission of Investigation for the Former Italian Colonies (1948) to end Ethiopian occupation of Somali territories, return all Somali territories held by the Ethiopians and unify the territories under a United Somaliland. It was soon after this that he died in 1949. 

Administration
The Gadabuursi Kingdom was established more than 600 years ago and consisted of a King (Ugaas) and many elders.

Hundreds of elders used to work in four sections consisting of 25 elders each:

Social committee
Defense – policing authorities consisting of horsemen (referred to as fardoolay), foot soldiers and spear-men, but also askaris or soldiers equipped with poison arrows.
 Economy and collection of taxes
 Justice committee

The chairmen of the four sections were called Afarta Dhadhaar, and were selected according to talent and personal abilities.

A constitution, Xeer Gadabuursi, had been developed, which divided every case as to whether it was new or had precedents (ugub or curad).

The Gadabuursi King and the elders opposed the arrival of the British at the turn of the 20th century, but they ended up signing an agreement with them. Later, as disagreements between the two parties arose and intensified, the British installed a friendly Ugaas against the recognized traditional Ugaas in hopes of overthrowing him. This would eventually bring about the collapse of the kingdom.

 Customary Law (Xeer) 

 The Law of the King and the 100 Men (Xeerka Boqorka iyo Boqolka Nin) 
When a new Ughaz (Ugaas) was appointed amongst the Gadabuursi, a hundred elders, representatives of all the lineages of the clan, assembled to form a parliament to promulgate new Xeer agreements, and to decide which legislation they wished to retain from the reign of the previous Ugaas. The compensation rates for delicts committed within the clan were revised if necessary, and a corpus of Gadabuursi law, as it were, was placed on the statutes for the duration of the new Ugaas's rule.

This was called 'The Law of the King and the 100 men' (Xeerka Boqorka iyo Boqolka Nin).

Richard Francis Burton (1856) describes the Gadabuursi Ugaas as hosting equestrian games for 100 men in the Harrawa Valley, also known as the Harar Valley or Wady Harawwah, a long running valley situated in the Gadabuursi country, north of Harar, Ethiopia. He states:
"Here, probably to commemorate the westward progress of the tribe, the Gudabirsi Ugaz or chief has the white canvass turban bound about his brows, and hence rides forth to witness the equestrian games in the Harawwah Valley."

 Traditional Gadabuursi installation ceremony 

Here is a summary of a very full account of the traditional Gadabuursi installation ceremony mentioned by I. M. Lewis (1999) in A Pastoral Democracy:

"The pastoral Somali have few large ceremonies and little ritual. For its interest, therefore I reproduce here a summary of a very full account of the traditional Gadabuursi installation ceremony given me by Sheikh 'Abdarahmaan Sheikh Nuur, the present Government Kadi of Borama. Clansmen gather for the ceremony in a well-wooded and watered place. There is singing and dancing, then stock are slaughtered for feasting and sacrifice. The stars are carefully watched to determine a propitious time, and then future  Ugaas is chosen by divination. Candidates must be sons or brothers of the former Ugaas and the issue of a woman who has been only married once. She should not be a woman who has been divorced or a widow. Early on a Monday morning a man of the Reer Nuur (the laandeer of the Gadabuursi) plucks a flower or leaf and throws it upon the Ugaas. Everyone else then follows his example. The man who starts the `aleemasaar acclamation must be a man rich in livestock, with four wives, and many sons. Men of the Mahad Muuse lineage then brings four vessels of milk. One contains camels' milk, one cows' milk, one sheeps' milk, and the last goats' milk. These are offered to the Ugaas who selects one and drinks a little from it. If he drinks the camels' milk, camels will be blessed and prosper, if he drinks, the goats' milk, goats will prosper, and so on. After this, a large four-year-old ram is slaughtered in front of him. His hair is cut by a man of the Gadabuursi and he casts off his old clothes and dons new clothes as Ugaas. A man of Reer Yuunis puts a white turban round his head, and his old clothes are carried off by men of the Jibra'iin... The Ugaas then mounts his best horse and rides to a well called Bugay, near Geris, towards the coast. The well contains deliciously fresh water. Above the well are white pebbles and on these he sits. He is washed by a brother or other close kinsman as he sits on top of the stones. Then he returns to the assembled people and is again acclaimed and crowned with leaves. Dancing and feasting recommence. The Ugaas makes a speech in which he blesses his people and asks God to grant peace, abundant milk, and rain—all symbols of peace and prosperity (nabad iyo 'aano). If rain falls after this, people will know that his reign will be prosperous. That the ceremony is customarily performed during the karan rainy season makes this all the more likely. The Ugaas is given a new house with entirely new effects and furnishings and a bride is sought for him. She must be of good family, and the child of a woman who has had only one husband. Her bride-wealth is paid by all the Gadabuursi collectively, as they thus ensure for themselves successors to the title. Rifles or other fire-arms are not included in the bride-wealth. Everything connected with the accession must be peaceful and propitious."

Leaders

Currently Abdirashid Ughaz Roble III Ughaz Dodi is the Ughaz of the Gadabuursi.

 Y-DNA
DNA analysis of Dir clan members inhabiting Djibouti found that all of the individuals belonged to the Y-DNA Haplogroup T-M184. The Gadabuursi belong to the T-M184 paternal haplogroup and the TMRCA is estimated to be 2100–2200 years or 150 BCE. A notable member of the T-M184 is the third US president, Thomas Jefferson.

Clan tree
The Gadabuursi clan are divided into 2 main divisions, the Habar Makadur and Habar 'Affan.

The Habar Makadur and Habar 'Affan, both historically united under a common Sultan or Ughaz.GadabuursiHabar Makadur (Makadoor)
Makahil
'Eli 
'Iye
'Abdalle (Bahabar 'Abdalle)
Hassan (Bahabar Hassan)
Muse 
Makail Dera (Makayl-Dheere)
Afgudud (Gibril Muse)
Habr Sanayo
Younis (Reer Yoonis)
'Ali Younis
Jibril Younis (Jibriil Yoonis)
Adan Younis (Aadan Yoonis)
Nur Younis (Reer Nuur)
Mahad 'Ase
Bahabar Abokor
Bahabar Muse 
Habr Musa 
Bahabar Aden 
Bababar 'Eli 
Reer Mohamed 
Abrahim (Abrayn)
Habar 'Affan
Jibrain
Ali Ganun
Gobe
Habar Yusif
Reer Issa
Hebjire
Reer Zuber
Dhega Wayne
Makayl
Musa
Musafin
Hassan Sá'ad
Farole
Reer Hamud

The following listing is taken from the World Bank's Conflict in Somalia: Drivers and Dynamics from 2005 and the United Kingdom's Home Office publication, Somalia Assessment 2001.Country Information and Policy Unit, Home Office, Great Britain, Somalia Assessment 2001, Annex B: Somali Clan Structure , p. 43

DirGadabuursi (Gadabursi')
 Issaq
 Issa
 Biimaal "Bimal"
 Surre 
 Quranyow of the Garre "Gorajno"
 Gurgura "Gurgure"
 Garrire "Gerire" 
 Gurre "Goora"
 Bajimal "Bajumal"
 Barsuug "Bursuk"

Notable figures
 Aden Sh. Hassan, prominent Somali diplomat and ambassador of Djibouti, part of the 3 ambassadorial brothers of the Horn of Africa. 
 Mohamed Sh. Hassan, prominent Somali diplomat and ambassador of Somalia, part of the 3 ambassadorial brothers of the Horn of Africa. 
 Ismail Sh. Hassan, prominent Somali diplomat and ambassador of Ethiopia, part of the 3 ambassadorial brothers of the Horn of Africa. 
 Ali Bu'ul, famous Somali poet from the 19th century, known for his geeraar's (short styled Somali poems recited during battles and wars)
 Roble Afdeb, famous legendary Somali warrior and poet, remembered for his bravery and clan-rivalry.
 Mohamed Farah Abdullahi (Hansharo), leader of Somali Democratic Alliance (f. 1989)
Aden Isaq Ahmed, Minister and Politician of the Somali Republic
Col. Muse Rabile Ghod, a Somali military leader and statesman of the  Somali Democratic Republic. 
Yuusuf Talan, General of the Somali National Army.
Abdi Buuni, first representative of Baki for garad Ali's USP party
Djama Ali Moussa. First Senator of Djibouti or French Somaliland
Ato Hussein Ismail. Ethiopian long-serving Statesman and first Somali to become a member of the Ethiopian Parliament
Abdirahman Aw Ali Farrah, first Somaliland Vice President, 1993–1997.
 Mawlid Hayir, current vice-president and minister of education and former governor of Jigjiga zone of the Somali region of Ethiopia.
Haji Ibrahim Nur, minister, merchant and politician of former British Somaliland Protectorate
Hibo Nuura, Somali singer
Abdi Hassan Buni, politician, minister of British Somaliland and first deputy prime minister of the Somali Republic.
Abdi Ismail Samatar, Somali scholar, writer and professor.
Ahmed Ismail Samatar, Somali writer, professor and former dean of the Institute for Global Citizenship at Macalester College. Editor of Bildhaan: An International Journal of Somali StudiesAbdirahman Beyle, former Foreign Affairs Minister of Somalia an economist
Abdisalam Omer, Foreign Affairs Minister of Somalia; former Governor of the Central Bank of Somalia
Sheikh 'Abdurahman Sh. Nur, religious leader, qādi and the inventor of the Borama script.
Dahir Rayale Kahin, third President of Somaliland
Ahmed Gerri of the Habar Maqdi(Makadi)/Makadur of the Conquest of Abyssinia
Sultan Dideh, sultan of Zeila, prosperous merchant and built first mosque in Djibouti. He also proposed the name "Cote francaise des Somalis" to the French
Yussur Abrar, former governor of the Central Bank of Somalia.
Ughaz Nur II,  11th Malak(King) of the Gadabursi.
Ughaz 'Elmi Warfa, 13th Malak(King) of the Gadabursi.
Ato Shemsedin, Somali Ethiopian Politician, previous Ethiopian ambassador to Djibouti, Kenya, Deputy Minister of Mining and Energy and first Vice Chairman and one of the founders of ESDL
Ayanle Souleiman, Djiboutian athlete
Hassan Mead, American distance runner, 2016 Olympic Men's 5000m finalist
Abdirahman Sayli'i, current vice-president of Somaliland
Ahmed Mumin Seed
Abdi Sinimo, a Somali singer and songwriter, noted for having established the balwo genre of Somali music.
Hassan Sheikh Mumin, author of Shabeel Naagood or (Leopard among the Women) and composed the song Samo ku waar, which became the national anthem of the Republic of Somaliland. 
Khadija Qalanjo, a popular Somali singer
Suleiman Ahmed Guleid, President of Amoud University
Omar Osman Rabeh, Somali scholar, writer, professor, politician and pan-Somalist. 
Barkhad Awale Adan, Somali journalist and director of Radio Hurma 

References

 Country Information and Policy Unit, Somalia Assessment 2001'', Home Office, Great Britain

 
Somali clans
Somali clans in Ethiopia